Lopukhov (from лопух meaning burdock) is a Russian masculine surname, its feminine counterpart is Lopukhova. It may refer to:

Fyodor Lopukhov (1886–1973), Russian ballet choreographer
Lydia Lopokova (née Lopukhova, 1892–1981), Russian ballerina, sister of Fyodor
Stanislav Lopukhov (born 1972), Russian swimmer

See also
Lopukhin

Surnames of Russian origin